Govind Sharan Lohra is an Indian folk artist. He is a Nagpuri folk singer, songwriter and dancer. He had performed in many national events. He is recipient of several awards including Akruti Samman, Peter Naurangi Sahitya Samman and Jharkhand Bibhuti. He was awarded Jaishankar Prasad Smriti Award in 2021.

Early life
He was born in Itta village in Lohardaga district. He is well versed in field of Nagpuri song writing, singing,  playing musical instruments and dancing. He belongs to Lohra community.

Career
He performed in several national events such as Rastriya Janjatiya Sammelan (1992) in Andaman and Nicobar Islands, Rastriya Ekta Sibir (1994) in Chittorgarh, Rajasthan, National folk music event (1996) in Patna, Chotanagpur Mohatsav (1999) in Bihar (Now Jharkhand), Bharatiya Kishan Sangh's national event (2000), Hastinapur, Uttar Pradesh and 4th Vanvasi Krida Mahotsav (2000) in Ranchi.

At present, he helps researchers in regional language Department of Ranchi University about Nagpuri folk music. At old age he has paralysis but he want his knowledge to give next generation. He advise youth to not distort folk music in the name of modernization.

Awards and recognition
He has been awarded several awards including Akruti Samman (2002), Peter Naurangi Sahitya Samman (2010) and Jharkhand Bibhuti (2012). He also received several certificate from Youth Hostel of India, New Delhi (1992), Bihar Government (1996), Sur Tarangi Sammajik evam Sanskritik Sanstha, Patna. He was awarded Jaishankar Prasad Smriti Award in 2021.

References 

Living people
Indian male folk singers
Indian male dancers
Indian male singer-songwriters
Year of birth missing (living people)
People from Lohardaga district
Nagpuria people